Lake Barbara is a ghost town in Brazoria County, Texas, United States. It is located within the Greater Houston metropolitan area.

History
It became a part of Brazosport sometime after 1944. It was incorporated as Lake Barbara Village in August 1954 and adopted home-rule charter status in 1957. Its population was 477 with four businesses in 1961. Five years later, the population grew to 500 and reached its high water mark of 625 in 1974. Two years later, it became a part of the Clute city limits, the city that it was originally a part of.

Geography

Education
Today, Lake Barbara is located within the Brazosport Independent School District.

References

Ghost towns in Texas